Leukocyte immunoglobulin-like receptor, subfamily A (with TM domain), member 1 is a protein that in humans is encoded by the LILRA1 gene.

References

Further reading